Khemarak Phoumin municipality is a municipality located in Koh Kong province in south-western Cambodia. The provincial capital Khemarak Phoumin is located in the municipality.

Administration

Notes

Districts of Koh Kong province